Çiftlikköy can refer to:

 Çiftlikköy
 Çiftlikköy, Acıpayam
 Çiftlikköy, Bayramiç
 Çiftlikköy, Dodurga
 Çiftlikköy, Düzce
 Çiftlikköy, Eldivan
 Çiftlikköy, İliç
 Çiftlikköy, İnegöl
 Çiftlikköy, Kovancılar
 Çiftlikköy, Sungurlu
 Çiftlikköy, Tavas
 Çiftlikköy, Yığılca